Kāneohe Bay, at , is the largest sheltered body of water in the main Hawaiian Islands. This reef-dominated embayment constitutes a significant scenic and recreational feature along the northeast coast of the Island of Oahu. The largest population center on Kāneohe Bay is the town of Kāneohe.

It has one of the two barrier reefs in the archipelago, the other being the  barrier reef of Molokai island, and also has extensive development of shoaling coral reefs within a large lagoon. Two navigable channels cut across the northern and southern ends of the barrier reef. The deeper, northern channel, located off Kualoa Regional Park, provides entrance from the North Pacific Ocean to a ship channel dredged the length of the lagoon between 1939 and 1945. The lagoon contains extensive patch and fringing reefs and its southern end is partly enclosed by the Mokapu Peninsula. This peninsula is occupied by Marine Corps Base Hawaii.

There are five named islands or islets within Kāneohe Bay. A sand bar (Ahu o Laka), Kapapa, and Kekepa (Turtleback Rock) are all islets on the barrier reef. Two islands within Kāneohe Bay are prominent: Mokolii and Moku o Loe (Coconut Island), the largest of the five.  Mokolii is a volcanic remnant at the very north end of the Bay, site of former Kualoa Airfield. The community on the northern side is called Waikane, or North Koolaupoko.

Coconut Island is an isolated volcanic remnant located in the southwest part of the bay.  Coconut Island is owned by the state of Hawaii and home to the University of Hawaii, and Pauley-Pagen Laboratory (SOEST). Coconut Island was used for the opening sequence of the television program Gilligan's Island.

In August 2010, Pirates of the Caribbean: On Stranger Tides was filmed on the bay.

Geologically, Kāneohe Bay forms part of a former caldera of the Koolau volcano. In prehistory, most of the volcano catalysmically slid into the Pacific Ocean, leaving behind only the Range and the Bay.

See also
  Kamehameha Highway

References

External links
 
Chinaman's Hat
  Estuarine Area
Anchoring at Kāne‘ohe Sand Bar

Bays of Oahu
Lagoons of Hawaii
Submarine calderas
Bodies of water of Oahu